Lost at Last, Vol. 1 is the seventh studio album by American singer-songwriter Langhorne Slim. It was released on November 10, 2017 through Dualtone Records.

Track listing

Charts

References

2017 albums
Dualtone Records albums
Langhorne Slim albums